Scott Douglas Bamforth (born August 12, 1989) is an American-Kosovan professional basketball player for Rio Breogán of the Spanish Liga ACB.

Standing at 6 ft 2 in (1.88 m), he plays at the shooting guard position. He played college basketball at Western Nebraska CC and Weber State.

High school and college career
Bamforth attended and played for Del Norte High School in Albuquerque, New Mexico. He was named first-team all-state twice, as well as the New Mexico High School Player of the Year in 2007. He left Del Norte as the school's all-time leading scorer.

Bamforth committed to Western Nebraska Community College and averaged 18 points per game his first season (2008–09). He was named to the 2009–10 NJCAA Preseason All-America Third Team, but broke his arm before the first game, and decided to transfer to Weber State before the season began.

Bamforth played in 99 games overall for the Weber State Wildcats, with career averages of 13.6 points, 3.2 rebounds and 2.5 assists per game. He finished 11th in scoring in school history. He earned All-Conference honors each season, and set a school record with 259 career made 3-pointers, as well as the single-season record of 103. Both records were previously owned by Damian Lillard.

In March 2013, he was named to the Weber State Men's Basketball 50th Anniversary Team, as one of the school's best 50 players in its history.

Professional career
Bamforth signed with Spanish team Baloncesto Sevilla in August 2013. He averaged 10.9 points and 4.3 rebounds per game in 37 games.

In August 2014, Bamforth signed with UCAM Murcia on a one-year contract, and went on to average 8.9 points and 2.2 rebounds per game in 29 games.

Bamforth rejected an offer from Baloncesto Fuenlabrada, and instead returned to Baloncesto Sevilla in August 2015 on a two-year contract.

He signed for Le Mans Sarthe Basket (French Jeep Elite) for a one-year contract on June 22, 2020. Bamforth averaged 15.8 points and 3.6 assists per game. He re-signed with Le Mans Sarthe on June 24, 2021. Bamforth signed with Rio Breogán of the Spanish Liga ACB on August 2, 2022.

The Basketball Tournament (TBT) (2016–present) 
In the summers of 2016 and 2017, Bamforth played in The Basketball Tournament on ESPN for The Wasatch Front (Weber State Alumni). He competed for the $2 million prize in 2017, and for The Wasatch Front, he scored 27 points in their first round loss to Team Challenge ALS 97–81.

Personal life
His wife, Kendra, had his first son in November 2011. They named him Kingzton. However, Kendrea was diagnosed with pre-eclampsia, which required an emergency C section 34 weeks into the pregnancy. When Kingzton was born, he stopped breathing and turned blue. Doctors had to resuscitate the newborn.

"I thought they both pretty much were going to die because that's what they told me from the start could happen. It seemed like forever," he later said. They both survived, and in the following game against Northern New Mexico, he made five three-pointers and then made seven in a career-best 28 point performance against Utah State four days after that.

References

External links
 Liga ACB bio
 Weber State bio
 Eurobasket bio

1989 births
Living people
American expatriate basketball people in France
American expatriate basketball people in Italy
American expatriate basketball people in Spain
American men's basketball players
Basketball players from Albuquerque, New Mexico
Bilbao Basket players
CB Breogán players
CB Murcia players
Dinamo Sassari players
KK Budućnost players
Kosovan expatriates in Spain
Kosovan men's basketball players
Kosovan people of American descent
Lega Basket Serie A players
Le Mans Sarthe Basket players
Liga ACB players
Naturalised citizens of Kosovo
People with acquired Kosovan citizenship
Real Betis Baloncesto players
Shooting guards
Weber State Wildcats men's basketball players
Western Nebraska Cougars men's basketball players